This is a list of German television related events from 1972.

Events
19 February - Mary Roos is selected to represent Germany at the 1972 Eurovision Song Contest with her song "Nur die Liebe läßt uns leben". She is selected to be the seventeenth German Eurovision entry during Ein Lied für Edinburgh held at the SFB Studios in Berlin.

Debuts

ARD
 16 January –  (1972)
 4 April – Privatdetektiv Frank Kross (1972)
 9 April – Die rote Kapelle (1972)
 4 July – Butler Parker (1972–1973)
 21 July – Die Schöngrubers (1972)
 25 October – Sonderdezernat K1  (1972–1982)
 27 October – Fußballtrainer Wulff  (1972–1973)
 29 October – Eight Hours Don't Make a Day  (1972–1973)
 29 November – Alexander Zwo  (1972–1973)
 13 December - Musikladen (1972-1984)
 Unknown – Clochemerle (1972)

ZDF
 26 January – Semesterferien (1972)
 6 February – Die Abenteuer des braven Soldaten Schwejk (1972)
 6 December –  Im Auftrag von Madame (1972–1975)

Television shows

1950s
Tagesschau (1952–present)

1960s
 heute (1963-present)

Ending this year
 Father Brown (since 1966)
 Percy Stuart (since 1969)
 Salto Mortale (since 1969)
 Beat-Club (since 1965)

Births
25 September - Steven Gätjen, American-born TV host

Deaths